The 2012 Bacha Khan International Airport attack was a coordinated assault on Bacha Khan International Airport and the adjacent Pakistan Air Force Base Peshawar on 22 December 2012 by Tehrik-i-Taliban terrorists in Peshawar, Khyber Pakhtunkhwa, Pakistan.

Assault

The attack was preceded by at least five rockets being fired towards the airport. Three of those landed within the facility, which also houses a Pakistan Air Force base, while the other two hit nearby residential areas. The heavily armed militants then rammed an explosives-laden vehicle into the perimeter wall, sparking a firefight with troops posted nearby. Officials at the Khyber Teaching Hospital said they had received the bodies of four civilians, and that more than 40 others had been injured, including children, women and senior citizens, many of whom who were hit by bullets or shrapnel from rockets. Senior official Umar Ayub described the condition of at least four of the wounded as serious. Security officials said five terrorists were killed in the gun battle with troops, and no one managed to actually enter the airport itself. Bomb disposal experts defused four suicide jackets.

Reactions
Defence minister Naveed Qamar said the attack was well planned out and terrorists were heavily armed, however the response by the security forces ensured there had been no damage to property or loss of life within the airport. A Pakistan Air Force spokesman released a statement, saying that "Security forces were fully alert and responded to the attack... There is no damage to equipment and personnel".

Officials from the Civil Aviation Authority said the airport was shut down after the attack began and all flights coming to Peshawar were diverted to Islamabad and Lahore. Additional security forces were deployed around the airport and troops searched houses in nearby neighbourhoods.

Responsibility
The banned Tehrik-e-Taliban Pakistan claimed responsibility for the attack. A spokesman for the group told reporters in the country's northwest that the target of the attackers was the PAF airbase. The assault was reportedly launched from a nearby village named Abdra, according to a PAF spokesman, who added that a joint counter-terrorism operation by several security agencies was under way. The BBC reported that the Islamic Movement of Uzbekistan also played a role in the attack.

See also
Terrorist incidents in Pakistan in 2012
2014 Quetta Airbase attack

References

21st-century mass murder in Pakistan
Mass murder in 2012
Spree shootings in Pakistan
Terrorist incidents in Pakistan in 2012
2012 in Pakistan
History of Peshawar
Terrorist attacks on airports
Terrorist incidents in Peshawar
Tehrik-i-Taliban Pakistan attacks
Islamic Movement of Uzbekistan
December 2012 events in Pakistan
Pakistan–Uzbekistan relations
2012 murders in Pakistan